Kevin Doherty (born November 6, 1958 in Toronto, Ontario) is a retired judoka from Canada, who represented his native country at two consecutive Summer Olympics: 1984 and 1988. He won the silver medal at the 1979 Pan American Games in the lightweight division (– 71 kg). He also won the bronze medal at the 1981 World Championships in the Half Middleweight division (78 kg). In 1986, he won the bronze medal in the 86kg weight category at the judo demonstration sport event as part of the 1986 Commonwealth Games.

See also
Judo in Ontario
Judo in Canada
List of Canadian judoka

References

 

1958 births
Living people
Canadian male judoka
Judoka at the 1984 Summer Olympics
Judoka at the 1988 Summer Olympics
Lightweight judoka
Martial artists from Ontario
Olympic judoka of Canada
Sportspeople from Toronto
Pan American Games silver medalists for Canada
Pan American Games medalists in judo
Judoka at the 1979 Pan American Games
Medalists at the 1979 Pan American Games
21st-century Canadian people
20th-century Canadian people